Nathan Strother (born September 6, 1995) is an American sprinter. Nathan Strother is a 2019 IAAF World Indoor Tour Winner. Strother is a member of gold medal 4x400 m relays at 2018 Toronto NACAC Championships, 2018 Athletics World Cup, and bronze in 400 m 2018 IAAF Continental Cup.

Career
Strother is a 2019 IAAF World Indoor Tour Winner. Strother is a member of gold medal 4x400 m relays at 2018 Toronto NACAC Championships, 2018 Athletics World Cup, and bronze in 400 m 2018 IAAF Continental Cup.

NCAA
Strother is a 11-time NCAA Division I All-American and Southeastern Conference runner-up.

Early life and prep
Nathan Strother graduated from Norcross High School c/o 2014 as a Georgia Class 6A state champion in the 400m outdoor track and field Georgia High School Association 6A state champion with high school personal best times of 38.31 (300-meter hurdles), 7.25 m (long jump) and 47.37 (400 meters) which were Norcross HS records.

In 2014, Strother placed 4th in the long jump (7.09 m), 4th in the 300 m hurdles (38.31) and 1st in the 400 m (47.37) at Georgia High School Association 6A state meet.

References

External links

Nathan Strother at Tennessee Volunteers

1995 births
Living people
American male sprinters
American male long jumpers
African-American male track and field athletes
Norcross High School alumni
People from Norcross, Georgia
Track and field athletes from Georgia (U.S. state)
People from Gwinnett County, Georgia
Sportspeople from the Atlanta metropolitan area
Tennessee Volunteers men's track and field athletes
University of Tennessee alumni
World Athletics Championships athletes for the United States
World Athletics Championships medalists
World Athletics Championships winners
21st-century African-American sportspeople